Morriston Hospital is a 750-bed hospital located in Cwmrhydyceirw near Morriston in Swansea, Wales. It is managed by Swansea Bay University Health Board.  Alongside its role as a district general hospital, Morriston is a teaching hospital for medical students of Swansea University Medical School.

History
The site was originally occupied by Maes-y-Gwernen Hall, a 19th-century farmhouse which was acquired by William Williams MP in 1885. Williams's son, Jeremiah Williams, inherited the house in 1904 and invited David Lloyd George to stay there in 1918. An emergency medical hospital was built on the site in 1942.

By the late 1970s the hospital needed modernising. The design, which was undertaken by William Simpson using a nucleus layout which was capable of expansion, was announced in December 1976 and planning permission granted in March 1978. Construction began in 1981 and the building opened in October 1985.

The Welsh Centre for Burns and Plastic Surgery, which was designed to provide care for the whole population of 2.3 million across West, Mid and South Wales, moved to the site from St Lawrence Hospital, Chepstow in 1994.

In 2015 the Health Board announced plans to expand the site with focus exclusively on the care of the sickest patients. Further to those plans, a new cardiac unit, built at a cost of £6.6 million, opened in August 2016.

Services & departments
The hospital is the site of the major Emergency Department for Swansea and is considered by the Health Board to be the major trauma unit for South West Wales. In addition to general surgical and medical services, Morriston houses the Welsh Centre for Burns and Plastic Surgery.

The hospital successfully trialled the use of robotic process automation to review rheumatology prescriptions in 2019. The Welsh government plans to set up an e-prescribing system.

Welsh Centre for Burns and Plastic Surgery 

The Centre was transferred from St Lawrence Hospital, Chepstow in 1994, and was designated the adult burns lead for the South West UK Burns Network in 2010 covering a population of over 10 million across southern Wales and South West England. The Centre treats both adults and children, while children with extensive injuries are transferred to the Bristol Royal Hospital for Children, and treats over 750 burns patients and over 6,500 plastic surgery patients a year.

Welsh Institute of Metabolic and Obesity Surgery 

The Institute was formed in 2010 and is the only centre for bariatric surgery in Wales. The institute assess all Welsh patient referrals and undertakes surgery for patients in South Wales, with North Wales patients being referred to Salford.

Public transport
The hospital is served by a regular bus service between Morriston Hospital and Singleton Hospital.

References

External links 

 
 Morriston Hospital on the NHS Direct Wales website
 Healthcare Inspectorate Wales inspection reports

Hospital buildings completed in 1941
Hospital buildings completed in 1985
NHS hospitals in Wales
1942 establishments in the United Kingdom
Hospitals established in 1942
Teaching hospitals in Wales
Hospitals in Swansea
Swansea Bay University Health Board